A sewing table or work table is a table or desk used for sewing. Generally it has large amounts of space and a full set of sewing tools.  Nearby there will be a chair and a waste bin.  A common attachment is a dropleaf to give expanded space. Other attachments can be a cloth bag for storing sewing materials, drawers, or shelves.

History 
The sewing table originated in England around 1770 and was adopted in post-Revolutionary War America. Prior to the use of the sewing table, women kept needlework in a basket or bag. It was designed to provide a surface and storage for a gentlewoman’s needlework or other leisure actives, including basket-weaving, crochet, macramé and painting as it was customary for women to gather and take up work around the table. The majority of tables created in the U.S. during this time were of Sheraton or Empire style and constructed of mahogany.

In the mid-1800s, sewing machines were developed and the sewing table was altered to accommodate a machine. The Singer cabinet works was established in 1868 as a contractor constructing the Singer Company’s sewing tables in South Bend, Indiana. The plant was designed initially for sewing table distribution in the Western United States. In 1891, the plant expanded covering 60 acres and 20 acres of lumber yards with a factory railroad. The new plant handled all Singer operations with tables being shipped to the Eastern U.S. as well as Europe, South America, and Asia.

References

Sewing equipment
Furniture
Tables (furniture)